The Silas Dean House is a historic house at 8 Pine Street in Stoneham, Massachusetts.  Built c. 1840, it is a stylistically rare form of a Greek Revival cottage.  The front of the house is a front porch sheltered by the slope of the roof, rather than a more traditional gable-end orientation.

The house was listed on the National Register of Historic Places in 1984.  Period detailing present on the porch at the time of its listing, including turned posts and a bracketed frieze, has been lost by subsequent alterations (see photo).

See also
National Register of Historic Places listings in Stoneham, Massachusetts
National Register of Historic Places listings in Middlesex County, Massachusetts

References

Houses on the National Register of Historic Places in Stoneham, Massachusetts
Houses in Stoneham, Massachusetts